Cape Kinsey is an ice-covered cape at the east side of Davies Bay, Antarctica. It was discovered in February 1911 by Lieutenant H.L.L. Pennell, Royal Navy, of the British Antarctic Expedition under Robert Falcon Scott, and was named by the expedition for Mr. J.J. Kinsey, who was the official representative of the expedition at Christchurch, New Zealand.

References

Headlands of Oates Land